Derrick Wells (born July 8, 1993) is an American football safety. He played college football at Minnesota.

Tampa Bay Buccaneers

Wells was signed as an undrafted rookie on May 18, 2015.

References

External links
Tampa Bay Buccaneers bio
Minnesota Gophers bio

1993 births
Living people
American football safeties
Minnesota Golden Gophers football players
Tampa Bay Buccaneers players
People from Lee County, Florida